
Gmina Tokarnia is a rural gmina (administrative district) in Myślenice County, Lesser Poland Voivodeship, in southern Poland.

Villages
Gmina Tokarnia contains the villages and settlements of Bogdanówka, Krzczonów, Skomielna Czarna, Tokarnia, Więciórka and Zawadka.

Neighbouring gminas
Gmina Tokarnia is bordered by the gminas of Budzów, Jordanów, Lubień, Maków Podhalański and Pcim.

References
Polish official population figures 2006

Tokarnia
Myślenice County